The canton of Ailly-sur-Somme is an administrative division of the Somme department, in northern France. It was created at the French canton reorganisation which came into effect in March 2015. Its seat is in Ailly-sur-Somme.

It consists of the following communes:

 Ailly-sur-Somme
 Airaines
 Argœuves
 Avelesges
 Belloy-sur-Somme
 Bougainville
 Bourdon
 Bovelles
 Breilly
 Briquemesnil-Floxicourt
 Camps-en-Amiénois
 Cavillon
 La Chaussée-Tirancourt
 Clairy-Saulchoix
 Creuse
 Crouy-Saint-Pierre
 Dreuil-lès-Amiens
 Ferrières
 Fluy
 Fourdrinoy
 Fresnoy-au-Val
 Guignemicourt
 Hangest-sur-Somme
 Laleu
 Le Mesge
 Métigny
 Molliens-Dreuil
 Montagne-Fayel
 Oissy
 Picquigny
 Pissy
 Quesnoy-sur-Airaines
 Quevauvillers
 Revelles
 Riencourt
 Saint-Aubin-Montenoy
 Saint-Sauveur
 Saisseval
 Saveuse
 Seux
 Soues
 Tailly
 Warlus
 Yzeux

References

Cantons of Somme (department)